Richard John Burde (July 29, 1871 – December 17, 1954) was a Canadian politician. He served in the Legislative Assembly of British Columbia from 1919 to 1928  from the electoral district of Alberni, as an Independent Liberal.

References

Independent MLAs in British Columbia
1871 births
1954 deaths
People from Muskegon County, Michigan
American emigrants to Canada